Muthuvel Karunanidhi (3 June 1924 – 7 August 2018) was an Indian writer and politician who served as Chief Minister of Tamil Nadu for almost two decades over five terms between 1969 and 2011. He was popularly referred to as Kalaignar (Artist) and Mutthamizh Arignar (Tamil Scholar) for his contributions to Tamil literature. He had the longest tenure as Chief Minister of Tamil Nadu with 6,863 days in office. He was also a long-standing leader of the Dravidian movement and ten-time president of the Dravida Munnetra Kazhagam political party. Karunanidhi has the record of never losing an election to the Tamil Nadu Assembly, having won 13 times since his first victory in 1957. Before entering politics, he worked in the Tamil film industry as a screenwriter. He also made contributions to Tamil literature, having written stories, plays, novels, and a multiple-volume memoir. Karunanidhi died on 7 August 2018 at Kauvery Hospital in Chennai after a series of prolonged, age-related illnesses.

Karunanidhi was born in the Tamil Nadu village of Thirukkuvalai on 3 June 1924. His parents were from the Isai Vellalar caste, a caste of musicians that perform at temples and other social gatherings. Growing up in a caste-ridden culture, Karunanidhi was learned about the crippling circumstances that arose from being born into a low caste. When he was 14, he formed a student movement against the imposition of Hindi as India's national language during the Anti-Hindi agitation of 1937–40. This served as a forerunner to Karunanidhi's wider anti-Hindi demonstrations in 1965. As a high school student, Karunanidhi created the Tamil Nadu Tamil Manavar Mandram, the Dravidian Movement's first student wing. He also started a news paper during his school days, which grew into the Murasoli, the DMK's official publication. Karunanidhi began participating in theatrical productions at a young age, including composing plays. Later on, he started writing for movies. As a writer, he wrote  screenplays, historical novels, screenplays, biographies, poems and novels. He utilized his writing to propagate reformist ideals effectively. He wrote the script and dialogue for M.G. Ramachandran's (MGR) maiden film as a hero, Rajakumari. He also composed the dialogue for Sivaji Ganesan's debut film, Parasakthi. He was critical of organized religion and superstition. He was an atheist and a self-described rationalist.

Karunanidhi started his political career in 1957, when he was voted to the Madras state legislature. When the DMK first entered the state legislature the following year, he was named treasurer and deputy leader of the opposition. Karunanidhi ascended quickly through the ranks. After the death of C.N. Annadurai in 1969, he became the DMK's leader and Chief minister of Tamil Nadu and led the party to a landslide win in the 1971 Assembly elections. He was influenced by the rationalist and egalitarian ideology of Periyar and DMK founder C N Annadurai. Karunanidhi was among those who fought Indira Gandhi's Emergency in 1975 which led to governments getting dismissed in 1976. In the 1976 Assembly elections, he gave the Congress 50 percent of the seats, but the partnership fell apart, and MGR prevailed. After MGR's death in 1989, he led the party to power. His administration was dismissed in 1991 for its alleged links with the Liberation Tigers of Tamil Eelam (LTTE). He came to power in the state in 1996 after forming a partnership with the Tamil Maanila Congress and joined the United Front led by Deve Gowda in the center. His party allied with the BJP in 1999. He was arrested from his house in 2001 by the police on the orders of Jayalalitha as an act of vendetta over alleged losses in construction of fly-overs. In the Lok Sabha elections of 2004, he teamed up with the Congress and won by a landslide. He became a chief minister again in 2006. In the 2014 Lok Sabha elections, he contested alone and lost. In 2016, he made the DMK become the Tamil Nadu Assembly's biggest opposition party.

During his political career, Karunanidhi advocated for increased state autonomy and affirmative action to favour lower castes. He implemented a caste-based quota system for government employment and government school students, as well as subsidies to the poor. His initiatives were quickly adopted in other Indian states. His initiatives earned him popularity among the lower castes. He was frequently confronted with accusations of nepotism. He has also stirred controversies by publicly supporting the LTTE and other separatist groups in Sri Lanka. During his different tenures, he implemented a number of initiatives aimed at promoting the expansion of industry in the state. He was also instrumental in erecting a 133-foot monument of Thiruvalluvar in Kanyakumari and ensuring classical language status to Tamil language.

Early life and family

Karunanidhi was born on 3 June 1924, in the village of Thirukkuvalai in Nagapattinam district, Madras Presidency, to Ayyadurai (Grand father) Muthuvel and Anjugam. He had two elder sisters, Periyanayaki and Shanmugasundari. There was some misconception that his birth name was Dakshinamurthy, later changed to Karunanidhi as influenced by Dravidian and rationalist movements, Karunanidhi himself stated that C.N. Annadurai asked him to keep his birthname "Karunanidhi", since it is already popular among the people. In his own writings Karunanidhi said that his family were of the Devadasi (renamed as Isai Vellalar) caste, a small community that traditionally played musical instruments at ceremonial occasions; however his political rival M. G. Ramachandran and some observers contested that and said that he was of Telugu ancestry. Karunanidhi started his education at a local school. Karunanidhi's father was eager to teach him music. His music teachers were from the Isai Vellalar group, and the lessons were conducted in temples where he was not allowed to cover his upper body, wear slippers, or wear a cotton cloth around his hips as a sign of respect for the upper caste people. He couldn't tolerate learning in an environment where he wasn't treated with respect, which made his father agree to stop his music classes. His father also asked the local headmaster to set up special tutoring courses for Karunanidhi and paid a tuition fee of milk every morning and evening.My music lessons were actually my first political studies. I learnt about the oppression of humans based on their caste. I saw the delight with which certain individuals could humiliate others, and the self-righteousness of others in carrying out their customs without realizing that they were mistreating a large majority of the people.

At the age of 12, he left to Thiruvarur to start his high school. Karunanidhi started to organize school students for the Anti-Hindi agitations. The deaths of two anti-Hindi agitators by the police made a profound impact on him. At the age of 13, he wrote his first Tamil historical novel titled Selvachandira.

Entry into politics and early writing career
Karunanidhi entered politics at the age of 14, inspired by a speech by Alagirisamy of the Justice Party, and participated in Anti-Hindi agitations. As a teenager he was captivated by the political writings of Tamil leaders including Panagal Arasar, Periyar and Pattukottai Azhagirisamy (after whom Karunanidhi later named one of his sons). Karunanidhi joined the anti-Hindi protests sparked by the provincial government's legislation making Hindi-education mandatory in schools, and in 1938 organised a group of boys to hold demonstrations travelling around Tiruvarur on a cycle rickshaw. The law was rescinded in 1939. The taste for activism however stuck and in the ensuing years, after a brief flirtation with Communism, Karunanidhi started following the work and speeches of leaders of Justice Party, Self-Respect Movement and Dravidar Kazhagam. According to Karunanidhi, he joined the Periyar's movement when he saw his father hurriedly rising and tied his towel to his waist from his head as a gesture of servitude when an upper caste landlord walked past him.

At the age of fifteen, Karunanidhi started his own magazine Maanavanesan. He along with his friends would make fifty copies of the magazine and circulate it and also sometimes mailed them to the leaders of Self-respect movement. A political activist after reading his magazine asked him to lead the forum for peace, liberty equality and justice, he accepted and became its elected secretary. Later, he dissolved the forum after there was a blatant attempt to convert the forum into as a front of the Congress party. He refunded the subscription money many refused to take the refund. Using the rest of seventy-five rupees, he started the Tamil Nadu Tamil students association in 1941. In 1942, the association held an annual function attended by Bharathidasan K.A Anbazhagan and K. A. Mathiazhagan and student leaders from Annamalai university. He couldn't afford to pay for the invitees' and guest speakers' travels and expenditures, so he was forced to steal a gold necklace that his mother had made for him but which he rarely wore, pawned it for 50 rupees, and paid his invitees.

As his writings were gaining popularity in Thiruvarur, he started Murasoli to widen his publishing platform. Its writer and chief editor was Karunanidhi, and its secretary was his friend Thennavan. It had a large print run, was mailed to many Tamil political organisations, and was in the forefront of the fight against caste, social isolation, sophistry, and supremacy. He wrote a critical piece in Murasoli titled "Varnama, Maanama?" in 1944 when a conference was organized by conservatives in support of varna system. He penned an article named 'Ilamaibali' (Youth Sacrifice) and sent it to C.N Annadurai's Dravida Nadu magazine. It appeared in the next issue. For a week, he wandered the streets of Thiruvarur with a print in hand, persuading many others to read it. He also penned an article that was never published. Within a week, Annadurai arrived in Thiruvarur for a public gathering and asked for Karunanidhi, he was stunned to find Karunanidhi as an 18-year-old school student. He instructed him to cease writing until he completed his education and asked him not to send any more articles. Karunanidhi refused to go back as a school student.

He failed three times in his final exams. During the result day, unable to face his family over his third consecutive failure, he left to Thopputhurai in search of his classmate Asan Abdul Kaathar who consoled him. He then started his passion of writing as a career. In Thiruvarur, he started writing and staging plays. These plays served as a channel for the Dravidian movement's ideology to spread. In Thiruvarur, he presented a play named Palaniappan to raise cash for his student association. The total amount collected was only Rs 80, despite the fact that the performance had cost him Rs 200 to stage. He had no idea how he was going to repay the debt he owed to the individuals who were now harassing him for it. He travelled with his friend Thennavan for Nagapattinam, keen to take his chances somewhere else and met with R. V Gopal, a local leader of the Dravidar Kazhagam. Gopal sympathised with his situation but was hesitant to lend him the money but Instead bought the play for Rs 100. The sale of his first play made his to write more ideological plays.

His parents didn't approve of his writing career. They advised him to look for a job that would pay him at least Rs 50 per month. He was determined on not taking a regular job. Karunanidhi then fell in love with a girl. He was certain that the girl was infatuated with him as well. When he and his family met the girl's parents, they demanded that if a wedding was to take place, it must be performed in the presence of Brahmin priests and vedic chanting. Karunanidhi rejected, citing his belief in the Self-Respect movement as justification.

After marriage, he worked as a playwright through the help of R.V Gopal who help his earlier with his play. Their first camp for the troupe was at Villupuram where he was joined by his friends Thennavan and C.T Murthy. Their plays failed to bring people even after the attendance of Periyar and Annadurai. The failure was due to their comments against the caste prejudices, the troupe was named "Dravida Theatre group", the term "Dravida" was perceived to be a term for Dalits and hence non-Dalits boycotted it. The troupe started to play in Pondicherry which was at the time a hub for social cultural and political change. His plays were an instant success and people started to call him as "Sivaguru", the name of his character. During his stay in Pondicherry, Karunanidhi penned "That Pen!" a criticism of Gandhi and the Congress centred on a pen which was lost from the Sabarmati Ashram, which infuriated the congress workers. He followed up with a piece titled "What If Gandhi Became Viceroy?" Later, members of the congress attacked a public gathering in Pondicherry attended by Periyar, Annadurai, and Pattukottai Azhagirisamy. Karunanidhi was chased down and beaten until he fell unconscious. They dropped his unconscious body into the sewers and departed, thinking he was dead. He was nursed back by an old women and taken to Periyar who applied medicines to him and took him to Erode along with him where he worked as an assistant editor with Periyar's Kudi Arasu magazine in Erode for a year.

Early political career
Karunanidhi along with a group of young band of Tamil enthusiasts led by Annadurai dissented from Dravidar Kazhagam and formed the Dravida Munnetra Kazhagam (DMK) on 17 September 1949.

Kallakudi demonstration 

The first major protest that aided Karunanidhi in gaining ground in Tamil politics was his involvement in the Kallakudi demonstration in Kallakudi in 1953 when he was 29. The original name of this industrial town was Kallakudi. Kallakudi was renamed as "Dalmiapuram" by the state administration led by Rajagopalachari to commemorate the North Indian business magnate Ram Krishan Dalmia, who owned a cement factory there. DMK wanted to change the name back to Kallakudi because Ram Krishna Dalmia depicted north Indian hegemonic power and predatory businesses. In the protest Karunanidhi and his companions erased the name Dalmiapuram from the railway station and lay down on the tracks blocking the course of trains. Six people died in the protest and Karunanidhi was arrested and was sent to jail for six months.

MLA and deputy leader of opposition 
At the age of 33, Karunanidhi entered the Tamil Nadu assembly by winning the Kulithalai seat in Tiruchirapalli during the 1957 election among the 15 DMK legislators elected. During the 1959 elections of the Madras Municipal Corporation, he was managing the party campaigns, the party won 45 out of the 90 contested. He was elected as DMK treasurer on 25 September 1960. Karunanidhi was elected to the state assembly for the second time on 21 February 1962, from the Thanjavur constituency. He defeated Congress candidate A.Y.S. Parisutha Nadar. In the same year, he became the deputy leader of opposition in the state assembly.

During this time, Karunanidhi recognised the necessity for a regular engagement with party cadres. He began sending daily letters to his party members, whom he referred to as udanpirappukal (blood brothers), a practice he followed for fifty years.

1965 Anti-Hindi Agitations and imprisonment 

Anti-Hindi agitations in Tamil Nadu started when the Union government announced that Hindi would become the single official language. The DMK, led by CN Annadurai, planned to organise a series of rallies against the action and declared 26 January to be a day of mourning. Chants of 'Hindi Ozhiga, Tamil Vaazhga' (Down with Hindi, long live Tamil) were heard everywhere. Violence continued across the state and several set themselves on fire. Karunanidhi, the leader of the DMK's anti-Hindi agitation, was arrested on 16 February 1965, and was sentenced to six months imprisonment at the Central Prison in Palayamkottai. He was later released at 15 April 1985.

Minister of state 

Annadurai declared Karunnanidhi as a DMK candidate for the February 1967 Madras Legislative Assembly election, at the DMK's State-level meeting at Virugambakkam, Chennai. Karunanidhi, as DMK treasurer, raised 11 lakh rupees for the party's election campaign. For the first time, the DMK was elected with an absolute majority in February 1967 and Annadurai became the Chief minister. After being elected to the Saidapet Assembly constituency in Chennai in March 1967, Karunanidhi was appointed as the Minister of Tamil Nadu Public Works Department.

On 14 January 1969, under CN Annadurai's administration, Madras State was rechristened as Tamil Nadu. Karunanidhi was in control of five ministries at the time: Transportation, Public Works, Highways, Ports, and Minor Irrigation.

First term as Chief minister (1969–1971)

On 3 February 1969, the existing chief minister Annadurai died of cancer. On 9 February 1969, the DMK's MLAs chose Karunanidhi to lead the party. He was also chosen as the DMK's legislative assembly leader. Karunanidhi was appointed chief minister on 10 February 1969, the next day and was sworn in by Governor Sardar Ujjal Singh. Members of the DMK selected him as the leader of the DMK on 27 July 1969, a position that had been kept vacant during Annadurai's tenure in honour of Periyar.

The six Ministers of Annadurai's Cabinet were kept by Karunanidhi. In addition to his own ministries, Karunanidhi took on the ministries of late Annadurai and Nedunchezhiyan, who had refused to join his cabinet.

He once found himself in a difficult situation in the state Assembly when members of the Congress party and Rajagopalachari's Swatantra Party hammered him and his amateur ministers with hard questions. Swatantra Party MP HV Hande described his new government as 'third rate.' Karunanidhi sprang up and exclaimed, 'Sorry, this is not third-rate government', This is a fourth-rate government." The house was startled for a few minutes. Some people believed Karunanidhi had admitted to the government's incompetence. Then Karunanidhi indicated that his government of Shudras, the lowest caste in the caste hierarchy which enraged the opposition.

Karunanidhi started sending letters to his party members in Murasoli, opening with the words "Udan pirappe" (My blood brothers). These letters covered a wide range of themes, including the DMK's philosophy, his justifications for various party actions, and encouragements to party members to work very hard throughout electoral campaigns, among other things. Karunanidhi sent around 7,000 of these letters to party leaders between 1969 and his death in December 2016. They were later published in seven volumes.

Karunanidhi sponsored and presided over a State Autonomy Conference in Madras on 12 September 1970, which included Periyar, West Bengal Chief Minister Ajoy Mukherjee, numerous Parliamentarians, and other dignitaries.

During his tenure, he granted legal status to self-respect marriages and implemented a number of other programs aimed at protecting women and children. Karunanidhi's administration established the Sattanathan commission for backward classes in 1969 to recognize underprivileged groups and give them with representation in government employment and educational institutions. He implemented the "Manu Needhi Thittam", which mandated district officials to set aside a day every week to hear public grievances, and set up grievance redress procedures. Karunanidhi founded the Tamil Nadu Slum Clearance Board in September 1970 to build permanent houses for those living in slums. His government gave free eye surgeries for the blind from the 'Kannoli Thittam" In 1970, he proposed the Tamil Nadu Land Reforms (Reduction of Ceiling on Land) Act, which cut the maximum amount of land a family could possess to 15 standard acres, down from 30 acres under the previous Congress rule.

Second term as Chief Minister (1971–1976) 

In March 1971, Karunanidhi formed an alliance with the Congress headed by Indira Gandhi, on the precondition that her party will not contest in any Assembly seats. In March 1971, the DMK contests for both the Assembly and the Lok Sabha. The DMK-Congress combination beat the Swatantra Party-Congress (Organisation) alliance led by Kamaraj and Rajagopalachari. The DMK won a landslide victory, with its candidates capturing 184 of the 234 seats on the ballot. Karunanidhi is re-elected as Chief Minister of Tamil Nadu for the second time. He was elected from Saidapet.

Chief Minister M. Karunanidhi dismissed DMK's Treasurer M.G. Ramachandran from the party. He made this decision in response to a request from 26 of the executive council's 31 members. Karunanidhi later described the decision as "painful" at a public platform. The DMK send him a requisition accusing him of breaking party rules. MGR said he was banned because he "demanded the party's finances, especially those connected to elections". But the finances were submitted to the party executive committee. There had been conflict in the past, with MGR wanting to be Health Minister but Karunanidhi unwilling to satisfy him. On 18 October 1972, MGR founded the ADMK.

M Karunanidhi in 1970 issued an order that he said would "eliminate the thorn in the heart" of social reformer Periyar. The decree made it possible for people of all castes to become priests in public temples. However, the Supreme Court overturned this decision in 1972.

Until 1973, Governors raised the national flag in state capitals on both Republic Day and Independence Day. Karunanidhi protested in February of that year that the Chief Ministers were "ignored" on Independence Day and Republic Day. In view of the Rajamannar Committee's report on Centre-State relations(1969-1971) being submitted at the time, he was reinforcing his call for State autonomy. In July, Prime Minister Indira Gandhi gave in to his demands, announcing that Chief Ministers would now hoist the flag on Independence Day, while Governors would do so on Republic Day. Karunanidhi became the first Chief Minister of Tamil Nadu to raise the national flag at Fort St. George on 15 August 1974.

Karunanidhi launched the "Beggar rehabitation scheme" on his 48th birthday on 3 June 1971, and begged for funds for the scheme from shopkeepers near his residence, collecting Rs 3,000 and said "Begging is not an insult to the person doing the begging. But it is an insult to the country and society that made him a beggar." Karunanidhi established the Government Servants' Family Benefit Fund Scheme to give financial compensation to an employee's relatives in the event that he loses his job owing to permanent complete disability, medical incapacity, or death. In 1971, his government increased reservation for BC from 25% to 31% and the reservation for Scheduled Castes (SC) and Scheduled Tribes (ST) from 16% to 18%. Karunanidhi established a separate Ministry for the Welfare of the backward class, the first such in the country. During 1973, women were first inducted into the police force.

The Emergency and government dismissal 

He resisted to let the Emergency's on Tamil Nadu for approximately seven months, until his administration was ousted on 31 January 1976. Karunanidhi was a supporter of Jayaparakash Narayan's anti-Emergency campaign and was the first one to ally with his Janata Party. During an event at Don Bosco School, Karunanidhi stated, "Most likely, this would be my final public function as Chief Minister." He was dismissed before he even got home form the function. This occurred just 50 days before his tenure ended. The DMK suffered a great deal of damage once it was dismissed. 25,000 members of the party including Karunanidhi's close relatives and friends were imprisoned. His maternal uncle Murasoli Maran and his son M.K Stalin suffered health issues from torture and C. Chittibabu died trying to save M.K Stalin in prison.  He sent 200 rupees a month to their families of jailed DMK members through the party office.

A one-man Sarkaria Commission was established in February 1976 under Supreme Court judge Ranjit Singh Sarkaria, shortly after the Indira Gandhi government ousted the DMK administration after allegations of corruption were made by opposition leader MGR. DMK tried to make out that the investigation was an act of political vendetta. The Sarkaria commission described the evidence on the claims as "cogent, convincing, and reliable." Although none of the corruption charges against him were proved.

Leader of the opposition (1977–1983) 
AIADMK led alliance won 34 seats out of 39 seats in the 1977 Indian general election. Top party figures such as general secretary V.R. Nedunchezhiyan, K. Rajaram and S. Madhavan quit accusing Karunanidhi for the DMK's failure in the general elections and demanded Karunanidhi to resign as the party's leader. Later, DMK lost the 1977 Tamil Nadu Legislative Assembly election, Karunanidhi won from Anna Nagar consistency and became the leader of the opposition.

On 29 October 1977, DMK supporters brandished black flags and yelled "Go back, Indira!" as she exited the Madras airport for dissolving the DMK government in 1975. Indira Gandhi's vehicle was unable to pass through the black flag barrier in Madurai. Karunanidhi violated the police prohibition in Madras and led protests in Guindy. Karunanidhi and 28 other DMK leaders were detained the next day and were held in judicial custody.

MGR offered a kind hand to the Morarji Desai government, while Karunanidhi renewed his alliance with Indira Gandhi. When Indira returned to power following the untimely end of Desai's government, she lost no time in dissolving MGR's cabinet. In the 1980 Indian general election and 1980 Tamil Nadu Legislative Assembly election, the state voted in favour of the AIADMK. MGR was re-elected as Chief Minister. Karunanidhi was elected from Anna Nagar consistency again. In February 1982, Karunanidhi embarked on a week-long padayatra from Madurai to Tiruchendur, spanning about 200 kilometres, in order to seek 'justice' for Subramania Pillai, a Hindu Religious and Charitable Endowments Department (HR & CE) officer who was found dead in November 1980. There were allegations that he was assassinated to cover financial misappropriation in the Tiruchendur temple. While Chief Minister MGR said the victim died by suicide, the DMK claimed it was an assassination. Karunanidhi walked over 30 kilometres during the day with a large crowd of cadres and leaders, stopping for lunch in small towns along the way. He gave public speeches in the evenings. The number of persons joining the padayatra grew by the day, and it became a topic of conversation in every family. The ruling government alarmed by the DMK's support, appointed a one-man committee chaired by retired judge C.J.R. Paul. The conclusions of the panel were never presented to the Assembly. Karunanidhi was able to obtain a copy of the study and disclosed it to the public in 1982 which revealed the panel's conclusion that Pillai had not committed suicide.

Leader of the DMK (1983-1989) 
Karunanidhi and DMK general secretary K. Anbazhagan resigned from the State Assembly soon after the 1983 anti-Tamil riots in Sri Lanka in protest of the union government and state's failure to defend the Eelam Tamils in Sri Lanka. In May 1986, Karunanidhi established the Tamil Eelam Supporters Organisation (TESO) and held a major national conclave in Madurai to promote the Tamil aspiration for self-determination in Sri Lanka.

Soon after AIADMK's election win in 1980, Congress abandoned its ally DMK and allied with AIADMK. The 1984 elections took place against the backdrop of Prime Minister Indira Gandhi's assassination. In December 1984, contested as allies in both Lok Sabha and the State Assembly which conducted together and were carried to victory by the sympathy generated for Indira Gandhi and MGR who was undergoing a Kidney transplant in New york. After being voted to the legislative council in April 1984, Karunanidhi decided to skip the elections. In 1986, the MLC was however abolished by the then Chief Minister, the late MG Ramachandran.

Karunanidhi was instrumental in bringing the seven-party National Front together in Chennai in October 1988. With a plea for social justice, he backed Vishwanath Pratap Singh and his announcement of the Mandal Commission Report. Earlier on 17 September 1988, he organized a large rally in Chennai with largely DMK members and a public meeting to commemorate the National Front's formation. It was the largest rally Chennai has ever seen. Its inauguration was attended by 20 top national opposition leaders, including three non-Congress(I) chief ministers.

Third term as Chief minister (1989–1991) 

After a 13-year break, the DMK returned to power in 1989. Following MGR's death from a heart attack, the AIADMK split into two. The late Chief Minister MG Ramachandran's wife Janaki Ramachandran led one faction, while J Jayalalithaa led another that helped the DMK. With about 33% of the vote, the DMK was able to secure a solid majority of 151 seats. Karunandihi was elected Chief Minister for the third time from Chennai's Harbour constituency.

Karunanidhi allowed the LTTE to use Tamil Nadu as a rear base for its battle for Eelam Between 1989 and 1991, even after Prabhakaran took up arms against the Indian Peace Keeping Force (IPKF). Karunanidhi accused the Indian soldiers of rape and massacre of Tamils in Sri Lanka and refused to receive the returning soldiers. The Karunanidhi administration is then dismissed and placed under presidents rule by the Chandra Shekhar led union government after only two years of its five-year tenure due to its inability to act against Sri Lankan Tamil militants. Despite Governor S.S. Barnala's unwillingness to report to the Union Cabinet that Tamil Nadu's constitutional apparatus had broken down, the government has been dismissed.

He enacted legislations which provided financial assistance to widows and inter-caste weddings. In 1989, Karunanidhi passed a law giving equal rights to women in family properties. In 1989, Tamil Nadu became the first state to reserve 30% of government jobs for women. After announcing on 17 November 1990, that his government would give free power connection, he followed it up with a Government Order giving power connection to 12.40 lakh farmers. Women's self-help groups were first established in 1989 in Dharmapuri to integrate women and increase self-employment opportunities. In 1990, Karunanidhi separated reservation for Scheduled Castes (SC) and Scheduled Tribes (ST) which gave 1% separate quota for STs.

Leader of the DMK (1991–1996) 

Assassination of Rajiv Gandhi by the LTTE took place during the electoral campaign for the 1991 Indian general elections. The DMK was accused in the incident, mobs vandalised the properties of DMK members and functionaries. The allies AIADMK and the Congress campaigned together and spread propaganda claiming that the DMK was to responsible for Rajiv Gandhi's assassination and it worked. The AIADMK-Congress coalition won a decisive win in the Assembly elections on 24 June 1991, and Jayalalithaa is elected Chief Minister for the first time. Except for Karunanidhi, all DMK candidates lost in the elections.

Following the Demolition of the Babri Masjid in 1992, the DMK began holding rallies and public gatherings criticizing the inrentions of Kar sevaks. On 5 December 1992, Karunanidhi stated in Murasoli: "What does Kar Seva mean? God's service? Or The service of planting the seeds of unrest?".

Fourth term as Chief minister (1996–2001) 

In 1996, he formed an alliance with the Tamil Maanila Congress, led by G.K. Moopanar, and was elected Chief Minister for the fourth time in the state. At the centre, he joined the Deve Gowda-led United Front government. Karunanidhi's party, which had only two seats in the 1991 elections got 173 MPs, nine more than the AIADMK had the year before.

In 1999, Karunanidhi made his most significant ideological concession. The DMK joined the BJP-led National Democratic Alliance to fight the elections, portraying Vajpayee as a softer ideological character than LK Advani. The National Democratic Alliance won the elections. Following the DMK's support of the BJP, the TMC, CPI(M), and CPI withdrew. The alliance with the BJP put him under increased pressure from both within and outside of the party. Following the 2002 Gujarat riots, Karunanidhi stated that both DMK and BJP were simply partners in the NDA and that the DMK had no intention of forming an alliance with the BJP. "We are not affiliated with the BJP." We are members of the NDA, and so is the BJP. That's it. So, where does the matter of forming an alliance with the BJP stand?". Later, A Raja said that Karunanidhi told him that he regretted the alliance.

He had to deal with caste animosity in numerous districts of Tamil Nadu throughout his tenure.

In 1996–97, Karunanidhi introduced the free bus pass system, which exempted government school and college students from paying for a ticket while giving private school and college students a 50% discount. Karunanidhi devised the Uzhavar Sandhai plan in 1999, which aims to promote farmer-to-consumer communication and remove the middleman and helped farmers gain more remuneration. He opened the Samathuvapuram (Equality Village) schemes in 145 places in Tamil Nadu in 1998 in order to forget and to eliminate caste-based segregation. His administration was credited for accelerating the IT revolution, introducing mini-buses for connectivity. Karunanidhi renamed Madras to Chennai to reflect Tamil identity. He introduced initiative which gives free education for the first graduate in a family up to their graduation. His decision to phase out hand-pulled rickshaws was enthusiastically applauded, and the rickshaw-pullers were given alternative work. He introduced the marriage assistance scheme for impoverished women. His government introduced legislation establishing 33% reservation for women in local government.

He was responsible for almost all of the state's major infrastructure projects which were implemented during this tenure including the Tidel Park, the Coimbatore flyover, the Koyambedu bus terminal, Gemini flyover in Chennai, the rehabilitation of Poompuhar, the Anna Centenary Library, and the grade separators in Chennai and the new Secretariat complex.

Thiruvalluvar statue 

On 31 December 1975, during a state cabinet meeting led by Karunanidhi, a plan was authorized to erect a statue for Thiruvalluvar at Kanyakumari. The DMK administration was dismissed a month later, and the state was placed under President's Rule. During his next term from 1989 to 1991, he resurrected the project. In March 1990, when presenting the Budget, he stated that a 133-foot-tall monument of Thiruvalluvar will be erected in Kanyakumari. He launched the project six months later. The project was restarted once he reclaimed power in May 1996. He unveiled the monument on New Year's Day, 2000.

2001 state elections 
Jayalalitha, who was aligned with the Tamil Maanila Congress, the Congress(I), the Pattali Makkal Katchi, the Communist Party of India, and other parties in 2001 Tamil Nadu legislative assembly elections received 49.89% of the vote, defeating the ruling DMK-led alliance by a large majority. Karunanidhi assumption that the DMK will be re-elected on the grounds of its government's good performance proved incorrect. His government's performance was praised by voters but it was not transferred into votes. Karunanidhi was elected from Chepauk constituency.

Leader of the DMK (2001–2006 ) 
He served as the president of the DMK. K. Anbazhagan was made the leader of opposition.

Controversy of arrests in Tamil Nadu about construction of flyovers 

In the midnight 30 June 2001, he was arrested on the orders of J. Jayalalithaa as an act of Vendetta based on a First Information report over of alleged losses of ₹12 crore on construction of flyovers filed by Commissioner J. C. T. Acharyalu who Karunanidhi had earlier kept under suspension. He was arrested after a few hours after the complaint with no time for investigation. Sun TV broadcast these images live across the state, the cops stormed in, busted open his bedroom door, and hauled him out. The images of Karunanidhi falling, being dragged, being lifted up and pushed by the police created a sympathy wave for him. T R Baalu and Murasoli Maran, two Union ministers, were also detained. Karunanidhi told reporters "They didn't have a summons. They didn't have an arrest warrant. They claimed that these were unnecessary. They dragged me. They pushed me. They ripped my shirt. We treated her with respect when we arrested her." Union Law Minister Arun Jaitley claimed it was a case of 'personal agenda'. The Union ministers were freed and the allegations against them were dismissed. Karunanidhi was later released on bail on humanitarian grounds. The police later dropped the case in 2006 citing it was a "mistake of facts".

2004 general elections 
Karunanidhi, on the other hand, left the BJP coalition in 2004 as the Union government refused to revoke the Prevention of Terrorism Act. He stood for the United Progressive Alliance led by the Congress party in the general elections, which won all 39 seats of the Parliament from Tamil Nadu.

Fifth term as Chief minister (2006–2011) 

On 8 May 2006, Karunanidhi's administration became the first minority administration in Tamil Nadu's history, and soon after declared a price cut for rice and the waiver of cooperative farmer loans, two of the DMK's main electoral promises. The DMK won 96 of the 234 seats and emerged as the single-largest party in the Assembly with the alliance of CPI-M, Congress and CPI. Karunanidhi won from Chepauk constituency.

Karunanidhi in January 2009 threatened to resign from the ruling alliance if India does not assist in securing a cease-fire in the Sri Lankan civil war.

In 2006, the DMK administration formed 30 special welfare boards entrusted with lobbying for the rights of disadvantaged and marginalised people ranging from transgenders to construction workers who may not have political influence or form voting groups and endure many forms of oppression. In 2006, Karunanidhi introduced the 'Anaithu Grama Anna Marumalarchi Thittam,' which aimed for the establishment of a library in each village panchayat.  In September 2006, he implemented the free land distribution scheme for the benefit of the landless poor. Karunanidhi saw the value of the ramp as a wheelchair user. He mandated that all new government buildings, as well as existing ones, include a ramp and an elevator. He reserved 3% of government jobs for the physically challenged. He launched the free gas connection distribution scheme in mid-January 2007. In September 2008, he declared that 1 kg of rice will be offered at ₹1 at PDS stores, surpassing the campaign promise of ₹2. In 2009, he introduced a special quota of 3 percent reservations for the Arunthathiyar community. In 2019, the Arunthathiyars started building a temple "as a mark of thanksgiving to Kalaignar". Karunanidhi launched the "Kalaignar Kapitu Thitam" in 2009 to give people from economically disadvantaged backgrounds receive quality medical treatments without discrimination. At least 3 out of 5 people in the state have medical insurance due to this scheme. In 2010, he introduced the "Kalaignar Veetu Vasathi Thittam" to convert thatched huts to concrete houses in the state. During this tenure he implemented the construction of new Collectorates in nine districts, many universities were established, and highways and flyovers were built. The bus terminal in Koyambedu in Chennai, which is the largest in Asia, was built. His health-care initiatives in the tenure, which included financial help for pregnant mothers, were well received by Jayalalithaa. Multiple medical camps were held around the state as part of the Varumun Kappom Thittam initiative, benefiting a huge portion of Tamil Nadu's population. Schemes were implemented to provide free color TVs to every family with ration cards and to provide gas stoves with free gas connection to the poor women who use wood stove-kerosene stove.

Leader of the DMK (2011–2016) 

During the 2011 Tamil Nadu Legislative Assembly election, the AIADMK alliance won 203 seats and the DMK alliance won 31. Karunanidi won by a huge margin of 50,249 votes Tiruvarur Assembly constituency. Following the defeat, M. Karunanidhi said, "People have given me proper rest," before congratulating the people of the state.

On his 86th birthday, Karunanidhi donated his Gopalapuram home to the Annai Anjugam Trust, which would manage a free hospital for the underprivileged after his and his wife's demise.

During the 2016 Tamil Nadu Assembly Elections, which the DMK lost only by 1.5 per cent votes. Karunanidhi won from Tiruvarur constituency with margin of 68,366 votes thereby recording his 13th straight victory since 1957.

In January 2017, Karunanidhi's son M.K Stalin was made as the working president of the DMK at the general council meet due to his deteriorating health.

Political policies

Sri Lankan Tamil issue 

Karunanidhi was known among his supporters as the "Tamil Inaththalaivar" (leader of the Tamil race) He was close to numerous Sri Lankan Tamil politicians. In 1956, Karunanidhi issued a resolution at the DMK council in Chidambaram denouncing Sri Lanka's 'Sinhala Only policy'. He was acquainted with S.J.V. Chelvanayakam and was close with A. Amirthalingam, the head of the Tamil United Liberation Front. After 1977 anti-Tamil pogrom and 1983 anti-Tamil pogrom, the his administration was at the forefront of organizing protest demonstrations in Tamil Nadu. In protest at the 1983 riots, Karunanidhi and DMK general secretary K. Anbazhagan resigned from the State Assembly.

The DMK was thought to support the Tamil Eelam Liberation Organization (TELO). After the LTTE started a war against its fellow Tamil militant group TELO in May 1986, Karunanidhi was skeptical of the LTTE's strategy. Karunanidhi founded the Tamil Eelam Supporters Organisation (TESO) and held a large national conference in Madurai in May 1986 to emphasize the Tamil aspiration for sovereignty in Sri Lanka, during which he urged the LTTE to cease murdering TELO cadre. The LTTE then proceeded to kill the majority of the TELO cadres. The infighting was criticized by Karunanidhi as Sagodhara Yudham' (A Battle Between Brothers). Since the AIADMK and MGR were prepared to support the LTTE as the only representation of Sri Lankan Tamils, his constant attempts to convey the necessity for an unified front to the LTTE were ignored. Karunanidhi was a vocal opponent of the decision to send Indian peace keeping forces (IPKF) to Sri Lanka as part of the Indo-Sri Lankan Accord, and he was accused of being anti-national for his outspoken criticism of the atrocities perpetrated by the IPKF. He viewed the expulsion of Muslims from the North by the LTTE in 1990 as "ethnic cleansing." His inaction against the LTTE in the state finally led to the Chandrasekhar government dismissing his cabinet in January 1991. After the assassination of Rajiv Gandhi by LTTE he was not friendly with the overt LTTE sympathizers in the state.

He ordered a special investigation of the conditions in the Tamil refugee camps in 2006, and subsequently provided funds to repair deteriorating dwellings. In 2009, during the final stages of the war, Karunanidhi was unable to convince the UPA alliance to intervene.

Tamil language 
Karunanidhi on multiple occasions, expressed his admiration for Thiruvalluvar. The DMK administration built Valluvar Kottam, a memorial in Chennai dedicated to Valluvar in the mid-1970s. However, the government was removed from power in 1976, just weeks before the memorial was to be opened. Karunanidhi awaited 13 years to visit the memorial, and when the DMK regained power in January 1989, he held the swearing-in ceremony there. Karunanidhi built the Silappadikaram Art Gallery in Poompuhar and a special department for Tamil development as Chief Minister. His administration passed an order making Tamil obligatory in all schools until Class 10th a few weeks after he became Chief Minister in May 2006. Karunanidhi, a supporter of the two-language formula, had stressed the need of retaining English as the sole additional language in educational institutions. After consulting with scholars, his government determined in 1972 that Thiruvalluvar was born in 31 BCE. Karunanidhi and Congress leader Sonia Gandhi were vital in ensuring classical language status to Tamil in 2004.

World Tamil Conference

He delivered the special address on the inaugural day of 3rd World Tamil Conference held in Paris in 1970, and also on the inaugural day of 6th World Tamil Conference held in Kuala Lumpur (Malaysia) in 1987. He penned the song "Semmozhiyaana Tamizh Mozhiyaam", the official theme song for the World Classical Tamil Conference 2010, that was set to tune by A. R. Rahman.

In June 2010,  his administration organized the World Classical Tamil Conference in Coimbatore. 'Ulaga Tamizh Manadu' (World Tamil Conference), was the first coined word for the conference in 2010, however the IATR organisation that had right to conduct the conference was not happy hence change in name. In the conference, Karunanidhi  described Tamil as supreme among all classical languages. He reinforced the demand for Tamil to be recognized as a language of the Madras High Court. Karunanidhi announced the foundation of the World Tholkappiyar Classical Tamil Sangam, that would include worldwide academics and will be based in Madurai, to hold World Classical Tamil Conferences at periodic intervals in the future. and to bring dispersed Tamil research centres and develop connections with Tamil organizations throughout the world.

Screenwriting

 

Karunanidhi began his career as a screenwriter in the Tamil film industry. His first movie as screenwriter was Rajakumari produced by Coimbatore-based Jupiter Pictures directed by A. S. A. Sami starring M. G. Ramachandran. During this period he and M. G. Ramachandran, then an upcoming actor and later day founder of AIADMK party started a long friendship eventually turning into rivals in later years politics. His stint with Jupiters Pictures then housed at Central Studios continued for another MGR starrer Abhimanyu, Marudhanaattu Ilavarasi (1950) starring M. G. Ramachandran and V. N. Janaki.

Around late 1949, T. R. Sundaram of Modern Theatres Studio in Salem engaged Karunanidhi as scriptwriter for the film Manthiri Kumari starring M. G. Ramachandran which would become be a blockbuster hit. Later T. R. Sundaram had Karunanidhi on permanent rolls at Modern Studio.

Karunanidhi chose to pen a script for a TV series based on the Vaishnavite philosopher-sage Ramanuja. He claimed that his party opposed Hindu fundamentalism, not Hindus.

Parasakthi
His most notable movie was Parasakthi, a turning point in Tamil cinema, as it espoused the ideologies of the Dravidian movement and also introduced two prominent actors of Tamil filmdom, Sivaji Ganesan and S. S. Rajendran. The movie was initially marred with controversies and faced censorship troubles, but was eventually released in 1952. becoming a huge box office hit. The movie was opposed by orthodox Hindus since it contained elements that criticised Hinduism. The story contained condemnation of Tamil Nadu's severe social disparities, India's power difference between South and the North, and the moral corruption of the Hindu priestly caste. Upper caste Hindus sought to ban the movie.

Two other movies written by Karunanidhi that contained such messages were Panam (1952) directed by famous comedian and political activist N. S. Krishnan and Thangarathnam (1960) produced and acted by S. S. Rajendran another popular actor and DMK activist. These movies contained themes such as widow remarriage, abolition of untouchability, self-respect marriages, abolition of zamindari and abolition of religious hypocrisy. Another memorable hit movie was Manohara (1954) starring Sivaji Ganesan, S. S. Rajendran and P. Kannamba known for its crisp dialogues.

Writing and narration style
Through his wit and oratorical skills he rapidly rose as a popular politician. As his movies and plays with strong social messages became popular, they suffered from increased censorship; two of his plays in the 1950s were banned. He was famous for writing historical and social (reformist) stories which propagated the socialist and rationalist ideals of the Dravidian movement to which he belonged. Alongside C. N. Annadurai he began using Tamil cinema to propagate his political ideals through his movies. His compositions, which often chastised upper castes while it making heroes out of the poor and advocating secularism, were seen as revolutionary.

Filmography
At the age of 20, Karunanidhi went to work for Jupiter Pictures as a scriptwriter. His first film, Rajakumaari, gained him much popularity. It was here that his skills as a scriptwriter were honed, which extended to several films. He was active in screenwriting even during his later political career until 2011 when he last wrote for historic movie Ponnar Shankar.

As a scriptwriter 

Ponnar Shankar (2011)
Ilaignan (2011)
Pen Singam (2010)
Uliyin Osai (2008)
Pasa Kiligal (2006)
Kannamma (2005)
Mannin Maindhan (2005)
Puthiya Parasakthi (1996)
Madurai Meenakshi (1993)
Kavalukku Kettikaran (1990)
Paasa Mazhai (1989)
Nyaya Tharasu (1989)
Thendral Sudum (1989)
Poruthadhu Pothum (1989)
Ithu Engal Neethi (1988)
Paasa Paravaigal (1988)
Paadatha Thenikkal (1988)
Makkal Aanaiyittal (1988)
Ore Raththam (1987)
Veeran Veluthambi (1987)
Neethikku Thandanai (1987)
Sattam Oru Vilayaattu (1987)
Puyal Paadum Paattu (1987)
Palaivana Rojakkal (1986)
Kaaval Kaithigal (1984)
Thooku Medai (1982)
Maadi Veettu Ezhai (1981)
Kaalam Pathil Sollum (1980)
Aadu Paambe (1979)
Nenjukku Needhi (1979)
Vandikaran Magan (1978)
Pillaiyo Pillai (1972)
Thanga Thambi (1967)
Valiba Virundhu (1967)
Avan Pithana? (1966)
Marakka Mudiyumaa (1966)
Mani Magudam (1966)
Poomalai (1965)
Poompuhar (1964)
Kaanchi Thalaivan (1963)
Iruvar Ullam (1963)
Thayilla Pillai (1961)
Arasilangkumari (1961)
Kuravanji (1960)
Ellorum Innaattu Mannar (1960)
Pudhumai Pithan (1957)
Pudhaiyal (1957)
Raja Rani (1956)
Rangoon Radha (1956)
Malaikkallan (1954)
Manohara (1954)
Ammaiyappan (1954)
Thirumbi Paar (1953)
Naam (1953)
Panam (1952)
Parasakthi (1952)
Manamagal (1951)
Devaki (1951)
Manthiri Kumari (1950)
Marudhanaattu Ilavarasi (1950)
Abimanyu (1948)
Rajakumaari (1947)

Television 
Romapuri Pandian (Kalaignar TV)
Ramanujar (Kalaignar TV)

Lyrics

Literature
Karunanidhi is known for his contributions to Tamil literature. His contributions cover a wide range: poems, letters, screenplays, novels, biographies, historical novels, stage-plays, dialogues and movie songs. He has written Kuraloviam for Thirukural, Tholkaappiya Poonga, Poombukar, as well as many poems, essays and books. Apart from literature, Karunanidhi has also contributed to the Tamil language through art and architecture. Like the Kuraloviyam, in which Kalaignar wrote about Thirukkural, through the construction of Valluvar Kottam he gave an architectural presence to Thiruvalluvar, in Chennai. At Kanyakumari, Karunanidhi constructed a 133-foot-high statue of Thiruvalluvar in honour of the scholar.

Books
The books written by Karunanidhi include Sanga Thamizh, Thirukkural Urai, Ponnar Sankar, Romapuri Pandian, Thenpandi Singam, Vellikizhamai, Nenjukku Needhi, Iniyavai Irubathu and Kuraloviam.  His books of prose and poetry number more than 100.

Stage plays
Karunanidhi's stage plays include: Manimagudam, Ore Ratham, Palaniappan, Thooku Medai, Kagithapoo, Naane Arivali, Vellikizhamai, Udhayasooriyan and Silappathikaram.

Personal life
Karunanidhi married three times. Karunanidhi's parents were eager to marry him off to Padma, the sister of C.S Jayaraman. He made one condition that the bride side must accept a reformist wedding. He hoped they would call off the marriage as he was not earning and the bride's father was religious but their family agreed to their marriage also held the marriage of their son C.S Jayaraman the same day. He married Padmavathi Ammal on 13 September 1944, under the Dravidian movement's Self-Respect form of marriage where the bride and groom exchanged garlands, without a thaali (mangalsutra), and specifically without Brahmin priests presiding. They had a son M. K. Muthu, who was briefly active in Tamil films and politics. Padmavathi died in 1948 soon after childbirth. In September of that year, Karunanidhi's marriage was arranged with Dayalu Ammal, with whom he had three sons, M. K. Alagiri, M. K. Stalin and M. K. Tamilarasu, and a daughter, M. K. Selvi. Alagiri and Stalin are active in state politics and competed to be their father's political successors, before Stalin prevailed. Tamilarasu is a businessman and film-producer and campaigner for his father and his party; Selvi campaigned for Karunanidhi elections too. With his third marriage with Rajathi Ammal, Karunanidhi had a daughter, Kanimozhi.

Karunanidhi's left eye got critically injured in 1953 when the vehicle in which he was travelling got involved in an accident near Tirupattur. An eye surgery was performed and doctors recommended him to wear sunglasses to protect his eyes from the sun. Karunanidhi used regular spectacles, However, after American ophthalmologists recommended for his ongoing discomfort in his left eye, which he had been suffering from since the mid-1950s, he switched to his trade-mark dark glasses in 1971. Doctors determined that the dark glass frames were too hefty for him in November 2017 and advised a lighter frame.

Since 2004, he has had to deal with his deteriorating health and struggled to stand when a spinal operation went wrong and became wheelchair-dependent. After a few years, he upgraded to a motorised wheelchair and a customized van with a hydraulic system to raise the chair into or out of the vehicle easily.

Illness, death and reactions

Due to a drug-induced allergy, Karunanidhi became unwell in October 2016. He was hospitalized in the first week of December 2016 for "optimization of nutrition and hydration" and subsequently for a throat and lung infections. He went through a tracheostomy surgery to improve his breathing. He has stayed out of politics since then, making just a few public appearances. His last public appearance was on 3 June 2018, when he turned 94.

On 28 July 2018, Karunanidhi's health deteriorated and became "extremely critical and unstable", and he was admitted at Kauvery Hospital in Chennai for treatment. He died there at 6:10 p.m. on 7 August 2018 due to age-related illness, which led to multiple organ failure.

The government of Tamil Nadu declared a public holiday on 8 August 2018 and a seven-day mourning after Karunanidhi's death. A national mourning on 8 August 2018 was announced by the government of India. The national flag flew half-mast in Delhi, all state capitals and across Tamil Nadu on 8 August 2018. The governments of Karnataka and Bihar announced one-day and two-days state mourning respectively.

On 18 August 2018, the DMK said that as many as 248 party workers died, 'shocked' by Karunanidhi's demise, and announced a solatium of Rs 200,000 to their families.

Awards and titles
 Annamalai University awarded him an honorary doctorate in 1971.
 He was awarded "Raja Rajan Award" by Tamil University, Thanjavur for his book Thenpandi Singam.
 On 15 December 2006, the Governor of Tamil Nadu and the Chancellor of Madurai Kamaraj University, Surjit Singh Barnala conferred an honorary doctorate on the Chief Minister on the occasion of the 40th annual convocation.
 In June 2007, the Tamil Nadu Muslim Makkal Katchi announced that it would confer the title "Friend of the Muslim Community" (Yaaran-E-Millath) upon M. Karunanidhi.

Elections contested and positions held
Karunanidhi contested and won in all Tamil Nadu Assembly general elections (then Madras) since 1957 except 1984 when he didn't contest the election. He resigned immediately after being elected in 1991, due to the routing of his party (only 2 seats out of 234).

Posts in legislature

Controversies

Ram Setu remarks
In September 2007, the Bharatiya Janata Party (BJP) opposed Sethusamudram Canal project stating that it will demolish limestone shoals the party claimed to be remains of a bridge built by Rama to get to Lanka to save his wife Sita. He replied, "It is said that there was a God thousands of years ago called Ram. Do not touch the bridge built by him. I ask who is this Ram? Which engineering college did he graduate from?" BJP leader Ravi Shankar Prasad accused Karunanidhi of religious discrimination when noting "We would like to know from Karunanidhi if he would make a similar statement against the head of any other religion." CPM general secretary Prakash Karat came to his support and said "in this country, there are individuals with religious views and people like us. It is not wrong to voice an opinion". Later, Karunanidhi clarified his remarks by saying that "I'm not against Ram, my conscience is my God".

Suspected Sangh Parivar activists attacked the house of Karunanidhi's daughter Selvi in Bangalore with petrol bombs and stones over his comments. A bus bound to Chennai was set on fire in Bangalore by a mob which burnt alive two people. The police blamed the attack on Hindu activists who were enraged over his comments. Karunanidhi reiterated his statement and said the attacks showed the "true culture of Ram Sevaks."

Connections with LTTE
In an April 2009 interview to NDTV, Karunanidhi made a controversial remark stating that "Prabhakaran is my good friend" and also said, "India could not forgive the LTTE for assassinating Rajiv Gandhi". An interim report of Justice Jain Commission, which oversaw the investigation into Rajiv Gandhi's assassination, had indicted Karunanidhi for abetting Rajiv Gandhi's murderers, who belonged to the Liberation Tigers of Tamil Eelam (LTTE). but the final report contained no such allegations.

Allegations of nepotism
Karunanidhi has been accused by opponents, by some members of his party, and by other political observers of trying to promote nepotism. Many political opponents and DMK party senior leaders have been critical of the rise of M. K. Stalin in the party. But some of the party men have pointed out that Stalin has come up on his own. Stalin was jailed under the Maintenance of Internal Security Act (MISA) during the Emergency that a fellow DMK party prisoner died trying to save him.

Books

 Sanga Tamizh
 Nenjukku needhi
 Thenpandi singam
 Thirukkural Urai
 Payum puli pandara vanniyan
 Sindhanaiyum seiyalum
 Nerukkadi neruppuaru
Pesum kalai Valarpom
Anaiya Vizhakku Anna
Yaaral? Yaaral? Yaaral?
Sanga Tamil
 Oru thalai kadhal
Pongi Varum Puthu Vellam
Kaala Pethayum Kavithai Saaviyum
Ilaya Samuthayam Elugave
 Kuraloviyam
 Kalaignarin kavithai mazhai
 Vaanpugazh konda valluvam
 Romapuri Pandiyan
 Iniyvai Irubadhu
Mani Magudam
Valimael Vizhivanthu
 Vellikizhamai
Marakka Mudiyuma
 Kalaignar sonna kathaigal
 Ponnar sankar

See also
List of political families
List of Indian writers
Karunanidhi family
First Karunanidhi ministry
Second Karunanidhi ministry
Third Karunanidhi ministry
Fourth Karunanidhi ministry
Fifth Karunanidhi ministry

Notes

References

Bibliography

External links

The Last Lear: A Long Profile of Muthuvel Karunanidhi by Vinod K Jose in The Caravan magazine
Muthuvel Karunanidhi: One Hundred Tamils of 20th Century

Dravidian movement
1924 births
2018 deaths
Chief Ministers of Tamil Nadu
Indian atheists
Indian male dramatists and playwrights
Indian male screenwriters
Tamil screenwriters
Dravida Munnetra Kazhagam politicians
Indians imprisoned during the Emergency (India)
Leaders of the Opposition in Tamil Nadu
Karunanidhi family
Chief ministers from Dravida Munnetra Kazhagam
Tirukkural commentators
People from Nagapattinam district
Madras MLAs 1957–1962
Madras MLAs 1962–1967
Tamil Nadu MLAs 1967–1972
Tamil Nadu MLAs 1971–1976
Tamil Nadu MLAs 1977–1980
Tamil Nadu MLAs 1980–1984
Tamil Nadu MLAs 1989–1991
Tamil Nadu MLAs 1991–1996
Tamil Nadu MLAs 1996–2001
Tamil Nadu MLAs 2001–2006
Tamil Nadu MLAs 2006–2011
Tamil Nadu MLAs 2011–2016
Tamil Nadu MLAs 2016–2021
Members of the Tamil Nadu Legislative Council
Screenwriters from Tamil Nadu
Deaths from multiple organ failure
Tamil Nadu politicians
People of the Sri Lankan Civil War
Indian Peace Keeping Force
Tamil television writers